Line 2 of Qingdao Metro is an underground metro line in Qingdao.

History
The eastern section was opened on 10 December 2017 with 18 stations from Zhiquan Road to Licun Park.

The western section from Zhiquan Road station to Taishan Road station opened on December 16, 2019. Haixin Bridge station on the section is not opened.

Opening timeline

Stations

Future Development
A  extension from Taishan Road to Lundu (Ferry Terminal) started construction on October 26, 2019.

References

Qingdao Metro lines
2017 establishments in China
Railway lines opened in 2017